Al-Hilal Educational Sport Club also known as Hilal Al-Fasher is a football club from Al-Fasher, Sudan. They play in the top level of Sudanese professional football, the Sudan Premier League.

Stadium
Their home stadium is Al-Fasher Stadium. It has a capacity of 10,000.

References

External links
Team profile – soccerway.com

Football clubs in Sudan